Mescal is a Census-designated place located in Cochise County, Arizona, United States.

Mescal was originally a populated place, at a rail station on the Southern Pacific Railroad at an elevation of 4,085 feet.  The modern community lies to the south of the railroad near Interstate 10, at 4,170 feet.  Mescal had a population of 1,812 in the 2010 Census. Mescal had a post office from 1913 until 1931.

Mescal appears on the Mescal U.S. Geological Survey Map.

Demographics

Transportation
Benson Area Transit provides transportation to Benson two days a week.

Popular culture

Parts of the movie Tom Horn, starring Steve McQueen, were filmed in Mescal.  Other productions filmed in Mescal include Tombstone (1993), The Quick and the Dead (1995) starring Sharon Stone and Leonardo DiCaprio, and Bill O’Reilly's Legends and Lies: The Real West - Doc Holliday (2015).

References

Unincorporated communities in Cochise County, Arizona
1913 establishments in Arizona
Unincorporated communities in Arizona